Kevin Smith (born 22 March 1961) is a British sprint canoer who competed in the mid to late 1980s. Competing in two Summer Olympics, he earned his best finish of fifth in the K-4 1000 m event at Los Angeles in 1984.

References
Sports-Reference.com profile

1961 births
Canoeists at the 1984 Summer Olympics
Canoeists at the 1988 Summer Olympics
Living people
Olympic canoeists of Great Britain
British male canoeists